= Jinling friendship award =

Award by Nanjing Municipal Government

The Jinling Friendship Award is an award established by the Nanjing Municipal Government in 2007. It is awarded to foreign scholars, experts and diplomats who have made outstanding contributions to Nanjing's economic construction and social development and ethics . It was awarded for the first time in 2010 and every two years thereafter.
